is a North Korean international school in Yahatanishi-ku, Kitakyūshū, Japan.

References

External links
 Kyushu Korean Junior-Senior High School  

High schools in Fukuoka Prefecture
Education in Fukuoka Prefecture
Buildings and structures in Kitakyushu
North Korean schools in Japan